Events in the year 1129 in Japan.

Incumbents
Monarch: Sutoku

Deaths
July 24 - Emperor Shirakawa (b. 1053)

References

 
 
Japan
Years of the 12th century in Japan